"Who Killed Cock Robin?" is the fourteenth episode of the ITC British television series Randall and Hopkirk (Deceased), starring Mike Pratt, Kenneth Cope and Annette Andre. The episode was first broadcast on 21 December 1969 on ITV.

Synopsis
In this murder mystery, Jeff Randall is hired by a large estate manager to investigate a series of bird shootings in the manor aviary and to keep guard of the valuable birds. On the death of the birds the over £2 million estate will be shared among the family, but each member of the family is killed off gradually narrowing down the suspects leaving Jeff with the surprising culprit. Randall is nearly killed in an intricate trap, but Marty Hopkirk once again saves the day — this time by affecting a paranormal game of letters to spell a cryptic message to Jeannie Hopkirk at a party.

Cast
Mike Pratt as Jeff Randall
Kenneth Cope as Marty Hopkirk
Annette Andre as Jeannie Hopkirk
Ivor Dean ...  Inspector Large
Susan Broderick ...  Carol
Gabrielle Brune ...  Mrs. Howe
Tenniel Evans ...  James Howe
Michael Goldie ...  Gimbal
Maurice Hedley ...  Col. Chalmers
Philip Lennard ...  Johns
David Lodge ...  Beeches
Cyril Luckham ...  Laverick
Jane Merrow ...  Sandra Joyce
Leslie Schofield...  Peter
David Webb ...  Police Sergeant

Production
Although the 14th episode in the series, Who Killed Cock Robin? was the 6th episode to be shot, filmed in August–September 1968.
The manor featured in the episode is Edgwarebury Hotel and Country Club.

References

External links

Episode overview at Randallandhopkirk.org.uk
Filming locations at Randallandhopkirk.org.uk

1969 British television episodes
Randall and Hopkirk (Deceased) episodes